The Employers' Liability (Compulsory Insurance) Act 1969 (c 57) is a UK Act of Parliament which requires that employers carry insurance against the personal injury of their employees.

Content
The insurance that employers must take out is referred to as Employer's Liability Compulsory Insurance (sometimes referred to as "ELCI"). As well as being insured, employers must post details of the insurance for staff to see. This requirement applies to most companies; exemptions include public organisations and certain micro companies.

Under section 5, offenders can be sentenced, on summary conviction in the Magistrates' Court, to a fine of up to level 4 on the standard scale (£2500).

Employers' Liability Tracing Office
The Employers' Liability Tracing Office (ELTO) is an independent UK agency set up to provide insurance claimants and their representatives with online access to a database of Employers' Liability Insurance policies, so that people suffering from a disease/injury caused at work with a former employer can identify who provides their insurance. It is organised as an independent, not-for-profit company limited by guarantee and funded by a levy. It was established in 2011 and is based in Milton Keynes. ELTO replaced a previous voluntary Employers' Liability Code of Practice (ELCOP) tracing service, which had been in place since 1999.

In February 2011, the Financial Services Authority published regulations concerning the way that insurers and intermediaries record employers' liability policy data.

Working abroad

The Act does not require compulsory insurance against illness and injury suffered by employees working abroad. Reid v Rush and Tompkins Group Plc (1989) established that there is no requirement to advise employees to obtain insurance for themselves:

In a number of contexts, Parliament has legislated to protect people in this country from the risks of uncompensated injury. Compulsory employer's liability insurance has been imposed. Save for certain limited exceptions that duty does not apply to employment out of this country. Even in the limited and modest terms of a duty to warn it might be difficult to impose by judicial decision a duty on employers in respect of their servants working abroad, which relates to loss through injuries suffered where the employer is not responsible, having regard to the fact that Parliament has not imposed an obligation to ensure even in respect of injuries for which the employer would be liable.

See also
UK labour law
English tort law

Notes and references

Liability insurance
United Kingdom Acts of Parliament 1969
United Kingdom labour law
1969 in labor relations
Employers
Organisations based in Milton Keynes